Fritz Wolmarans (born 7 March 1986) is a former professional South African tennis player.

Wolmarans has a career high ATP singles ranking of 198 achieved on 16 May 2011.

He also played for the South Africa Davis Cup team.

Tennis career

Juniors
As a junior, Wolmarans reached as high as No. 12 in the combined world rankings in 2004. He scored notable victories over Juan Martín del Potro and Fabio Fognini.

As a junior, he compiled a singles win–loss record of 49–31.

Junior Grand Slam results – Singles:

Australian Open: 3R (2004)
French Open: 2R (2004)
Wimbledon: 2R (2003)
US Open: 3R (2003)

Junior Grand Slam results – Doubles:

Australian Open: 1R (2004)
French Open: QF (2004)
Wimbledon: A 
US Open: A

Pro tour
In May 2011, Wolmarans reached his highest ATP singles ranking of World No. 198, whilst his highest doubles ranking is World No. 413 (achieved in September 2010). He has won one challenger in both singles and doubles.

ATP Challenger and ITF Futures finals

Singles: 14 (8 titles-6 runner-ups)

Doubles finals: 3 (1–2)

Singles performance timeline

References

External links
 
 
 

1986 births
Living people
Sportspeople from Bloemfontein
Sportspeople from Cape Town
South African male tennis players
White South African people